The 1967 Texas Longhorns football team represented the University of Texas at Austin during the 1967 NCAA University Division football season.

After coach Darrell Royal refused a bowl bid in the midst of the Longhorns' third consecutive 6–4 season, Texas played in the next six Cotton Bowls as Southwest Conference champion.

Schedule

References

Texas
Texas Longhorns football seasons
Texas Longhorns football